The Hundred of Kuitpo is a cadastral unit of hundred in the Adelaide Hills. It is one of the 11 hundreds of the County of Adelaide. It was named in 1846 by Governor Frederick Robe and is presumed to be derived from an indigenous term ku-it-po, meaning reeds and referring to Blackfellow Creek in the contemporary locality of Yundi.

History
Being in the County of Adelaide, the hundred was proclaimed in 1846 along with the earliest hundred proclamations in the state. The early local administration of the hundred was split in 1853 between four new district councils established within a few months of each other: the District Council of Willunga in the south west, the District Council of Kondoparinga in the centre, the District Council of Clarendon in the north west, and the District Council of Echunga in the north east. The latter three were amalgamated with much of the District Council of Macclesfield in 1935 to form the District Council of Meadows.

Towns and localities
The following localities and towns of the Alexandrina Council area are situated inside (or largely inside) the bounds of the Hundred of Kuitpo:
 Kuitpo
 Blackfellows Creek
 The Range (eastern part)
 Montarra
 Dingabledinga
 Hope Forest
 Kyeema
 Kuitpo Colony
 Mount Magnificent (north western part)

The following localities and towns of the City of Onkaparinga are situated largely inside the bounds of the Hundred of Kuitpo:
 Clarendon (south of Onkaparinga River)
 Kangarilla

The following localities and towns of the Mount Barker District Council area are situated inside (or largely inside) the bounds of the Hundred of Kuitpo:
 Hahndorf (west of main street)
 Paechtown
 Echunga (most part)
 Biggs Flat
 Chapel Hill
 Jupiter Creek
 Meadows
 Prospect Hill

See also
 Kuitpo, South Australia, contemporary locality at the centre of the hundred
 Kuitpo Colony, South Australia, contemporary locality at the south of the hundred
 Lands administrative divisions of South Australia

References

Kuitpo